Shah Fahad is a Pakistani theatre and television actor, writer, director. He has been a part of over 50 theatrical productions and more than 20 screen productions. He has also founded DramaEd and Pakistan Tehreek e Comedy. He generally plays mythological supporting and villainous roles in the serials. He is known for his TV roles as Nawab Shujaat Jehan in Mor Mahal and as Sajjad in Aakhri Station.

Television

Stage

References 

Living people
Pakistani television actors
Pakistani stage actors
Year of birth missing (living people)